Scutellaria nervosa, commonly known as the veiny skullcap, is a flowering plant in the mint family. It is native to the eastern United States where it is primarily found in the Ohio River drainage of the Midwest and Upper South. It is primarily found in alluvial, often calcareous forests.

It produces tubular white flowers with purple dots in late spring.

References

nervosa